Orange County is a county located in the very southeastern corner of the U.S. state of Texas, sharing a boundary with Louisiana, within the Golden Triangle of Texas. As of the 2020 census, its population was 84,808. The county seat is the city of Orange, and it falls within the Beaumont–Port Arthur metropolitan area.

History
Orange County was formed in 1852 from portions of Jefferson County. It was named after the orange fruit, the common citrus fruit grown by the early settlers of this county near the mouth of the Sabine River.
Due to periodic spells of quite cold winter weather (frosts) in Orange County, it is no longer the home of orange trees and citrus orchards. The production of those fruits in Texas long ago was moved a long way southwest into the Rio Grande Valley, where the weather is almost always warm all winter long. Citrus trees produce their fruit in the wintertime, which makes them especially vulnerable to frost and icy weather.

A similar thing has happened in Florida, where orchards of citrus trees no longer exist in either Citrus County or Orange County because of bad winter freezes in some years. In both Florida and Texas, the citrus agriculture has been moved farther south in search of milder winters, and away from the periodic frosts.

During World War II, Orange County was the home of a large amount of shipbuilding for the navies the United States and allied countries. During the war, the Consolidate Steel Corporation employed as many as 20,000 people at its shipyard in Orange.

Geography

Orange County is bordered on its east by the Sabine River, on its southeast by Sabine Lake, and on the northwest by the Neches River.

The geography of Orange County varies relatively little, with an elevation that reaches 33 ft (10 m) above sea level at very few points within the county. Orange County is very flat, and its soil is quite sandy, as could be expected in a county along the Gulf of Mexico. (Sandy soil is also common in southern Louisiana, Mississippi, and Alabama, and in western and southern Florida.) Saltwater marshes occur in much of the southeastern part of Orange County that borders the Sabine River. The  Piney Woods are in the northern part of the county.

Adjacent counties and parishes
 Jasper County (north)
 Newton County (north)
 Hardin County (northwest)
 Jefferson County (west)
 Calcasieu Parish, Louisiana (east)
 Cameron Parish, Louisiana (southeast)

National protected area
 Big Thicket National Preserve (part)

Communities

Cities

 Bridge City
 Orange (county seat)
 Pine Forest
 Pinehurst
 Port Arthur (mostly in Jefferson County)
 Rose City
 Vidor
 West Orange

Census-designated place
 Mauriceville

Unincorporated communities
 Forest Heights
 Little Cypress
 Orangefield

Ghost towns
 Lemonville
 Texla

Demographics

Note: the US Census treats Hispanic/Latino as an ethnic category. This table excludes Latinos from the racial categories and assigns them to a separate category. Hispanics/Latinos can be of any race.

As of the census of 2000,  84,966 people, 31,642 households, and 23,794 families resided in the county. The population density was 238 people per square mile (92/km2). The 34,781 housing units  averaged 98 per mi2 (38/km2). The racial makeup of the county was 87.98% White, 8.38% African American, 0.56% Native American, 0.78% Asian, 1.15% from other races, and 1.15% from two or more races. About  3.62% of the population was Hispanic or Latino of any race.

Of the 31,642 households, 35.30% had children under the age of 18 living with them, 58.80% were married couples living together, 12.10% had a female householder with no husband present, and 24.80% were not families. About 21.7% of all households were made up of individuals, and 9.30% had someone living alone who was 65 years of age or older. The average household size was 2.65 and the average family size was 3.08.

In the county, the population was distributed as 27.30% under the age of 18, 8.70% from 18 to 24, 28.10% from 25 to 44, 23.20% from 45 to 64, and 12.70% who were 65 years of age or older. The median age was 36 years. For every 100 females, there were 96.40 males. For every 100 females age 18 and over, there were 92.60 males.

Males had a median income of $40,185 versus $21,859 for females. The per capita income for the county was $17,554. About 11.40% of families and 13.80% of the population were below the poverty line, including 18.50% of those under age 18 and 12.40% of those age 65 or over.

Government
The Orange County Courthouse serves as the court for the region.  Republican County Judge John Gothia presides over the five-member Orange County Commissioners' Court.

Orange County lies in Texas House District 21, represented beginning in 2015 by Republican Dade Phelan of Beaumont.

United States Congress

Politics

Economy
Primary economic activities in Orange County are the petroleum refining industry, paper milling, rice farming, and shrimping.

Orange County was formerly a center for the building of warships, and a large U.S. Navy ghost fleet (reserve fleet) still exists in Jefferson County - from which currently, many old warships are being cleaned of water pollution sources and then scrapped for their metals, thus employment for residents of Orange County in shipbreaking.

Newspapers published in the county include the twice-weekly Orange Leader and weeklies including the Bridge City-based Penny Record, County Record, and Vidor Vidorian.

Transportation

Airports
Orange County Airport operates general-aviation flights.

Nearby Southeast Texas Regional Airport (Port Arthur) operates commercial flights.

Major highways
  Interstate 10
  U.S. Highway 90
  State Highway 12
  State Highway 62
  State Highway 73
  State Highway 87

Education
The county is served by five school districts:  Bridge City ISD,  Little Cypress-Mauriceville Consolidated ISD,  Orangefield ISD,  Vidor ISD, and West Orange-Cove Consolidated ISD.

See also

 National Register of Historic Places listings in Orange County, Texas
 Recorded Texas Historic Landmarks in Orange County

References

External links
 Orange County government's website
 Orange County in Handbook of Texas Online at the University of Texas
 Historic materials from the Heritage House Museum in Orange, hosted by the UNT's Portal to Texas History

 
1852 establishments in Texas
Populated places established in 1852
Hurricane Ike
Beaumont–Port Arthur metropolitan area